This is a list of foreign-born professional sumo wrestlers by country and/or ethnicity of origin, along with original name, years active in sumo wrestling, and highest rank attained. Names in bold indicate a still-active wrestler.

There are 186 wrestlers who have listed a foreign country as their place of birth on the banzuke or official ranking sheets. The first foreign born wrestler to reach the top makuuchi division was the Hawaiian born Takamiyama in January 1968, who was also the first to win a top division tournament championship or yūshō in 1972. He was followed by fellow Hawaiians Konishiki who was the first foreigner to reach the second highest ōzeki rank in 1987, and American Akebono who became the first foreign yokozuna, the highest rank, in 1993. In 1992, following the entry of six Mongolians to Ōshima stable, there was an unofficial ban (called enryo or "restraint") instigated by the Japan Sumo Association's head Dewanoumi on any more foreign recruitment. Speaking at a Western Japan Press Club luncheon in Osaka in 1995, Dewanoumi reportedly said, "There are no official regulations, but stable masters have a tacit agreement not to scout foreigners actively because they have difficulty adapting to Japanese customs." In 1998 this ban was relaxed but there was also the first official restrictions, a cap of forty foreigners in professional sumo as a whole, not counting those who had obtained Japanese citizenship. In February 2002 this was changed to one foreigner per heya or training stable, although foreigners recruited prior to the rule change were not affected. Despite these restrictions, foreigners began to dominate the highest levels of the sport. By 2013, foreign born wrestlers made up just seven percent of the 613 wrestlers active in professional sumo, yet occupied one third of the 42 spots in the top division. No Japanese-born wrestler won a top division tournament between Tochiazuma in January 2006 and Kotoshōgiku in January 2016, with 56 of the 58 tournaments held in that period won by Mongolians.

Several foreign-born sumo wrestlers have become sumo elders after their retirement as wrestlers.

Argentina

Hoshiandesu Hose - José Antonio Juarez - 1988–2000 - juryo 2
Hoshitango Imachi - Imachi Marcelo Salomon - 1987–2004 - juryo 3

Bolivia
Kirameki Takayoshi - Daniel Velez-Garcia - (Aichi) - 2020–2021 - sandanme 70

Brazil
Agora # - Lucas Kazuo Iima - Japanese-Brazilian - 2023–present - jonokuchi 15
Azumakaze Futoshi - Tuzatto Giuliano Kochinda - Italian-Brazilian - 1991–1999 - sandanme 29
Azumao Yasuhito - Yasuhito Marcio Morita - Japanese-Brazilian - 1994–2005 - makushita 36
Hakusan Momotaro - Pasquale Bosche - Italian-Brazilian - 1977–1986 - makushita 9
Kaisei Ichirō § - Ricardo Sugano - Japanese-Brazilian - 2006–2022 - sekiwake
Kaishin Kikuzo - Eiji Nagahama - Japanese-Brazilian - 2004–2012 - makushita 49
Kawamura Kosaku - Kosaku Kawamura - Japanese-Brazilian - 1976–1983 - sandanme 41
Kitaazuma Kiyoshi - Tetsuya Takeda - Japanese-Brazilian - 1991–1998 - makushita 18
Kiyonomine Minoru - Mario Minoru Akamine - Japanese-Brazilian - 1979–1989 - makushita 18
Kotonomori Takamori - Mario Fuchiue - Japanese-Brazilian - 1999–2000 - jonidan 69
Kotoosako Shigeaki - Shigeaki Julio Osako - Japanese-Brazilian - 1991–1994 - jonidan 106
Kuniazuma Hajime - Wander Ramos - 1991–2004 - juryo 4
Kuninosato Toshio - Roberto Toshio Wada - Japanese-Brazilian - 1980–1992 - makushita 23
Ryūkō Gō - Luis Go Ikemori - Japanese-Brazilian - 1992–1998 - juryo 8
Takaazuma Katsushige - Christiano Luis de Souza - 2004–2008 - makushita 24
Tatsunishiki - Yoshihira Takeuchi - Japanese-Brazilian - 1967–1971 - jonidan 6
Wakaazuma Yoshinobu - Yoshinobu Kuroda - Japanese-Brazilian - 1991–2003 - juryo 13

NOTE: (#) marks active foreign-born wrestler credited with Japanese shushin (hometown), and hence not counting against current one-foreigner-per-heya restriction; (§) marks a retired foreign-born wrestler who became a sumo elder.

Bulgaria
Aoiyama Kōsuke ‡ - Daniel Ivanov - 2009–active – sekiwake
Kotoōshū Katsunori § - Kaloyan Stefanov Mahlyanov (Karoyan Andō) - 2002–2014 - ozeki
Torakiō Daiki - Ventsislav Katsarov - 2017–2019 - sandanme 15

NOTES: (‡) marks active foreign-born wrestler naturalized as Japanese citizen; (§) marks a retired foreign-born wrestler who became a sumo elder.

Canada
Homarenishiki Yasokichi - Brodik Mackenzie Philip Henderson - 2015–2016 - sandanme 46
Kototenzan Toshimitsu - John Anthony Tenta Jr. - 1985–1986 - makushita 43

China

Chiyohakuryu Koto - Koto Haku (白光斗) - Nei Monggol - 2004–2011 - sandanme 22
Daiseizan Daisuke - Asihada - Nei Monggol - 2022–active - sandanme 67
Kaiho I - Yi Pan - Shanghai - 1990–1992 - jonidan 79
Kanoyama Sunyo - Chengyue Xie - 1991–1992 - jonokuchi 22
Kiyonohana Oyo - Lihua Zhang (Kazushi Yoshida) - Fujian - 1974–1978 - juryo 5
Kosei Ko - Shiqiang Gao (高世強) - Liaoning - 2003–2017 - makushita 14 
Kotoō Shuton - Shidong Wang (王世東) - Shandong - 1992–1993 - sandanme 9
Manazuru Hisashi - Songsong Cheng - Beijing - 2004–2015 - sandanme 13
Nakanokuni Sho - Chao Lu - Beijing - 2002–2012 - juryo 12
Ryutei Weifu - Weifu Li - Shandong -  2004–2013 - sandanme 3
Sōkokurai Eikichi § - Enkhtuvshin - Nei Monggol - 2003–2020 - maegashira 2
Takao Yu - Yu Wan - Shanghai - 1991–2003 - sandanme 41
Wakashoji Ano - Ano Cho - Jilin - 2010–2010 - jonokuchi 22

NOTES: Hong Kong and Taiwan are listed separately; (§) marks a retired foreign-born wrestler who became a sumo elder.

Czech Republic

Takanoyama Shuntarō - Pavel Bojar - 2001–2014 - maegashira 12

Egypt

Ōsunaarashi Kintarō - Abdelrahman Alaa el-Din Mohamed Ahmed Shalan – 2012–2018 – maegashira 1

Estonia

Baruto Kaito - Kaido Höövelson - 2004–2013 - ozeki
Kitaoji Oto - Ott Juurikas - 2004–2004 - jonidan 114

Georgia

Gagamaru Masaru - Teimuraz Jugheli - 2005–2020 - komusubi
Kokkai Futoshi - Levan Tsaguria - 2001–2012 - komusubi
Tochinoshin Tsuyoshi - Levan Gorgadze - 2006–active - ozeki
Tsukasaumi Joji - Merab George Tsaguria - 2005–2006 - sandanme 18

Hong Kong
Seiko - Zhenbang Gu - 1987–1989 - jonidan 88

Hungary

Masutoo Akira - Attila Toth - 2005–2021 - makushita 8

Indonesia

Kotoanbai Ken - Ken Anbai - 2015–2015 - jonokuchi 25

Japanese-born  of non-Japanese or mixed ethnicity

Asakomiya Masahiro - Masahiro Komiya - Korean-Japanese (Saitama) - 2006–2007 - jonokuchi 42
Baraki Genki - Baraki Ito - Filipino-Japanese (Saitama) - 2013–active - makushita 58
Daishoyu Maabin - Marvin Lee Sano Jr - American-Japanese (Tokyo) - 2006–2008 - makushita 18
Fujinohana Rei - Rei Saito - American-Japanese (Miyagi) - 2009–2017 - sandanme 16
Fujinoumi Jun - Jun Saito - American-Japanese (Miyagi) - 2009–2017 - makushita 47
Hayashiryu Ryu- Ryu Hayashi - Filipino-Japanese (Nagano) - 2022–active - jonidan 84
Hokuozan Kokichi - Hikari Hagiwara - Turkish-Japanese (Hokkaido) - 2020–active - makushita 35
Itadaki Sennosuke - Masahiko Kikuchi - Canadian-Japanese (Tokyo) - 2010–active - makushita 18
Ikazuchido - Neri Yamada - Nigerian-Japanese (Saitama) - 2022–active - jonidan 54
Kaitoma Aron - Mark Aron Justin Toma - Brazilian-Japanese-Filipino (Kanagawa) - 2017–active - jonidan 2
Kanazawa Hidetoshi - Hidetoshi Kanazawa (Aichi) - 2022–active - jonidan 80
Kaneshiro Kofuku - Kofuku Kaneshiro - Korean-Japanese (Miyazaki) - 1974–1987 - sekiwake
Maenoyama Tarō - Kazuichi Kaneshima - Korean-Japanese (Osaka) - 1961–1974 - ozeki
Maikeru Shuki - Maikeru Hayashi - Filipino-Japanese (Fukui) - 2017–active - makushita 29
Mienoumi Tsuyoshi - Goro Ishiyama - Korean-Japanese (Mie) - 1963–1980 - 57th yokozuna
Nabatame Tatsuya - Tatsuya Nabatame - Thai-Japanese (Tochigi) - 2020–active - makushita 20
Rao Nozomu - Rao Ito - Filipino-Japanese (Saitama) - 2011–active - makushita 37
Rinko Rei- Rei Hayashi - Filipino-Japanese (Nagano) - 2022–active - jonidan 85
Ryuga Tsunetaka - Corvin Ryuga Delzatto - American-Japanese (Kanagawa) - 2018–2020 - jonidan 80
Sentoryū Henri - Henry Armstrong Miller - African-American/Japanese (Tokyo - raised in Missouri) - 1988–2003 - maegashira 12
Taiga Koji - Taiga Tanji - Russian-Japanese (Fukushima) - 2018–active - makushita 45
Taihō Kōki - Koki Naya (Ivan Boryshko) - Ukrainian-Japanese (Karafuto) - 1956–1971 - 48th yokozuna
Takagenji Satoshi - Satoshi Kamiyama - Filipino-Japanese (Tochigi) - 2013–2021 - maegashira 10
Takanofuji Sanzō - Tsuyoshi Kamiyama - Filipino-Japanese (Tochigi) - 2013–2019 - jūryō 5
Takayasu Akira - Akira Takayasu - Filipino-Japanese (Ibaraki) - 2005–active - ozeki
Tamanoumi Masahiro - Masao Takeuchi - Korean-Japanese (Aichi) - 1959–1971 - 51st yokozuna
Tamarikidō Hideki - Hideki Yasumoto - Korean-Japanese (Tokyo) - 1997–2010 - maegashira 8
Tanji Jun - Jun Tanji - Russian-Japanese (Fukushima) - 2022–active - jonidan 43
Tochinowaka Michihiro - Daewon Lee - Korean-Japanese (Hyogo) - 2007–2015 - maegashira 1
Tsuyukusa Kazuki - Tsuyukusa Kazuki - Polish-Japanese (Kanagawa) - 2016–2020 - makushita 51
Wakatosho Toshio - Toshio Kanemoto - Korean-Japanese (Chiba) - 1985–1993 - jūryō 9

Kazakhstan

Kazafuzan Taiga - Suyenesh Khudibayev (Сүйініш Худибаев / Суйиниш Худибаев) - 2003–2014 - makushita 10
Kinbōzan Haruki - Baltagul Yersin (Балтағұл Ерсін) - 2021–active - maegashira 14

Korea, North

Rikidōzan Mitsuhiro* - Shin-rak Kim (김신락) / Mitsuhiro Momota (百田光浩) - 1940–1950 - sekiwake

NOTE: Korea was under Japanese rule from 1910 to 1945.  Japanese-born Koreans are noted above. Rikidōzan was officially recorded with a shusshin (hometown) of Ōmura, Nagasaki so is not regarded as having been a foreign rikishi by the Sumo Association.

Korea, South

Chiinoyama Shoichiro* - Shoichiro Toyokawa - 1940–1945 - juryo 3
Harimayama Hanataro - Sangjin Hong (홍상진 洪相鎭) - 1990–1994 - makushita 58 
Kaihakuzan Yungi - Yoongi Baek (백윤기 白允基) - 1999–2000 - sandanme 49
Kasugaō Katsumasa - Sungtaek Kim (김성택 金成澤) - 1998–2011 - maegashira 3
Kinryuzan Jongun - Jonggeun Kim (김종근 金鍾根) - 2003–2009 - sandanme 42
Koraiyama Yoshisuke - Gilryang Seo (서길량 徐吉亮) - 1969–1981 - makushita 11
Kotoyanagi - Shigeki Nishimoto (西本重煕) - 1983–1985 - jonidan 78
Kunimiyama - Kiju Kim (김기주 金基柱) - 1977–1988 - makushita 27
Kuninofuji Kiifun - Kihun Song (송기훈 宋基勳) - 2001–2002 - jonidan 109
Kyoryu Yoshitsuru - Seonhak Park (박선학 朴善鶴) - 1975–1983 - makushita 15
Nankaiyama Shigehide - Naruhide Kan / Seongyeong Kang (강성영 姜成英) - 1969–1971 - makushita 57
Nanzan Shuko - Suhyeong Chae (채수형 蔡洙亨) - 1990–1992 - sandanme 54
Soranoumi Ichiriki - Sooyong Kim (김수영 金樹泳) / Juei Ōzora (大空樹泳) - 1999–2019 - makushita 25
Watenko - Kazuo Hayashi - 1966–1970 - sandanme 80
Yamada Narihide - Seongyeong Yu (유성영) / Narihide Yamada (山田成英) - 2004–2006 - jonidan 31

NOTE: Korea was under Japanese rule from 1910 to 1945.  Japanese-born Koreans are noted above.

Mongolia

Aratoshi Mitsuo - Tserendorj Wanchigutseren - 2008–2016 - makushita 39
Arauma Toru - Battagtokh Turtogtokh - 2020–active - makushita 26
Arawashi Tsuyoshi - Dulguun Erkhbayar - 2002–2020 - maegashira 2
Asahiryū - Denzensambu Batzorig - 2016–2019 - makushita 23
Asahitaka Koichi - Bat-Orgil Tserenchimed - 1992–1993 - sandanme 97
Asasekiryū Tarō - Badarchiin Dashnyam - 2000–2017 - sekiwake
Asashōryū Akinori - Dolgorsürengiin Dagvadorj - 1999–2010 - 68th yokozuna
Azumaryū Tsuyoshi - Todbileg Sanduljav - 2008–active - maegashira 14
Bontensho Yuki - Naidan Bayarhuu - 2001–2003 - jonidan 25
Chiyoshōma Fujio - Ganbaatar Munkhsaikhan - 2009–active - maegashira 2
Daibanjaku Hisashi - Batsukh Khaidavmunkh - 1999–2004 - sandanme 10
Daionami Masaru - Batbaatar Uuganbayar - 2001–2016 - makushita 33
Daishōchi Kenta - Ulambayaryn Byambajav - 2001–2005 - makushita 15
Daishoho Kiyohiro - Shijirbayar Chimidregzen - 2013–active - maegashira 9
Daitenshō Ken - Norjinhand Ayurzana - 2001–2010 - makushita 7
Daitenzan Noritaka - Ganbat Batzaya - 2001–2005 - makushita 58
Daiyubu Ryusen - Davaadorji Undrah - 2001–2010 - juryo 10
Dewahikari Tsutomu - Ulziisuren Tsolmon - 2002–2009 - sandanme 3
Dewanoryu Kazuki - Tumurbaatar Temuulen - 2019–active - makushita 3
Fudoyama Subaru - Nyamjav Luvsandorj - 2000–2008 - sandanme 38
Gochozan Masashi - Delgersaikhan Uuganbaatar - 2006–2020 - makushita 7
Hakuba Takeshi - Ariunbayar Unurjargal - 2000–2011 - komusubi 
Hakuhō Shō § - Mönkhbatyn Davaajargal - 2001–2021 - 69th yokozuna
Harumafuji Kōhei - Davaanyamyn Byambadorj - 2001–2017 - 70th yokozuna
Hokuseiho Osamu # - Davaaninj Ariunaa (Hokkaido) - 2020–active - juryo 6
Hokutenkai Aoi - Sukhbat Galdan - 2019–active - makushita 5
Hokutomaru Akira - Nasanjargal Chinzorig - 2018–active - makushita 32
Hoshihikari Shin'ichi - Duvchin Lhagva - 2000–2011 - juryo 1
Hoshikaze Yoshihiro - Boldo Amaramend - 2002–2011 - juryo 3
Hoshizakura Aruta - Myagmar Altangerel - 2000–2012 - makushita 12
Hōshōryū Tomokatsu - Sukhragchaa Byambasuren - 2018–active - sekiwake
Ichinojō Takashi ‡ - Altankhuyag Ichinnorov - 2014–active - sekiwake
Kagamiō Hideoki - Nanjid Batkhuu - 2003–active - maegashira 9
Kakuryū Rikisaburō § - Mangaljalavyn Anand - 2001–2021 - 71st yokozuna
Kengo Shin - Turtuvshin Baatarkhuu - 2010–2011 - jonidan 63
Kiribayama Tetsuo - Lkhagvasuren Byambachuluun - 2015–active -  komusubi
Kitakasuga Ikko - Munkhbat Tsolmonbayar - 1999–2005 - sandanme 18
Kōryū Tadaharu - Erdene Munhk-Orgil - 2000–2011 - maegashira 11
Kotokenryu Takeaki - Gantulga Bilguun - Töv - 2022–active - sandanme 49
Kyokujishi Masaru - Tumendemberel Losol - 1992–1992 - jonidan 59
Kyokusetsuzan Eiji - Munkhbold Sharaa - 1992–1992 - jonidan 91
Kyokushūhō Kōki - Erdenbaatar Tumurbaatar - 2007–2022 – maegashira 4
Kyokushūzan Noboru - Davaagin Batbayar - 1992–2006 - komusubi
Kyokutenhō Masaru § - Nyamjavyn Tsevegnyam - 1992–2015 - sekiwake
Kyokutenzan Takeshi - Batmönkhiin Enkhbat - 1992–2008 - makushita 13
Maenoyu Taro - Gankhyag Naranbata - 2004–2007 - makushita 25
Mitoryū Takayuki - Turbold Baasansuren - 2017–active - maegashira 16
Mōkonami Sakae - Ganbold Bazarsad - 2001–2011 - maegashira 6
Oniarashi Chikara - Ulziibayar Ulziijargal - 2000–2014 - juryo 7
Oshoma Degi - Purevsuren Delgerbayar - 2021–active - juryo 13
Ryūō Noboru - Erkhem-Ochiryn Sanchirbold - 2000–2013 - maegashira 8
Ryuonami Katsuteru - Battugs Buyanjargal - 2010–2017 - makushita 11
Sadanohikari Shinta - Narantsogt Davaanyam - 2014–active - makushita 29
Sakigake Takeshi - Yagaanbaatar Battushig - 2003–2022 - juryo 10
Seirō Takeshi - Amgaa Unubold - 2005–2020 - maegashira 14
Senho Tsubasa # - Tsubasa Hasegawa - Japanese-Mongolian (Aichi) - 2019–active - sandanme 36
Senshō Hideki - Erufubaatar Bayarbat - 2001–2015 - juryo 14
Shironoryu Yasumasa - Erdentsogt Odogerel - 2003–2013 - juryo 1
Shōtenrō Taishi - Dagdandorj Nyamsuren - 2001–2018 - maegashira 2
Taiga Kisho - Sumiyabazar Sharbuyanhuu - 2001–2014 - makushita 19
Takanoiwa Yoshimori - Adiya Baasandorj - 2008–2018 - maegashira 2
Tamashoho Manpei - Erdenbileg Enkhmanlai - 2011–active - makushita 2
Tamawashi Ichirō - Batjargal Munkh-Orgil - 2004–active - sekiwake
Terunofuji Haruo ‡ - Gantulga Gan-Erdene - 2011–active - 73rd yokozuna
Tokisoma Baira - Ankhbayar Batbayar - 2017–active - makushita 25
Tokitenkū Yoshiaki - Altangadasyn Khüchitbaatar- 2002–2016 - komusubi
Tokusegawa Masanao - Ganbold Badamsambuu - 2003–2011 - maegashira 1
Toranoyama Kiyokazu - Ganbold Bat-Undral - 2001–2009 - sandanme 21

NOTES: (#) marks active foreign-born wrestler credited with Japanese shushin (hometown), and hence not counting against current one-foreigner-per-heya restriction; (‡) marks active foreign-born wrestler naturalized as a Japanese citizen; (§) marks a retired foreign-born wrestler who became a sumo elder.

Paraguay

Wakashio - Satoshi Miyawaki - Japanese-Paraguayan - 1985–1989 - sandanme 76

Philippines

Furanshisu Manabu - Teodoro Francis Robert Valles - Laguna - 2016–active - sandanme 53
Kōtokuzan Tarō # - Jasper Kenneth Arboladura Terai - Filipino-Japanese (Makati) - 2009–active - maegashira 16
Masunoyama Tomoharu - Tomoharu Kato - Filipino-Japanese (Chiba) - 2006–2021 - maegashira 4
Mitakeumi Hisashi # - Ōmichi Hisashi - Filipino-Japanese (Nagano) - 2015–active - ozeki
Tamahikuni - Jun Terrado - 1988–1988 - jonokuchi 30
Tamahinada - Angelito Labampa - 1988–1988 - jonidan 129
Tamahiryu - Samson Pael - 1988–1988 - jonokuchi 2

NOTE: (#) marks active foreign-born wrestler credited with Japanese shushin (hometown) and hence not counted against current one-foreigner-per-heya restriction.

Russia

Amūru Mitsuhiro - Nikolai Yuryevich Ivanov (Николай Юрьевич Иванов) - Primorsky Krai - 2002–2018 - maegashira 5
Aran Hakutora - Alan Gabaraev - North Ossetia-Alania - 2007–2013 - sekiwake
Hakurozan Yūta - Batraz Feliksovich Baradzov - North Ossetia-Alania - 2002–2008 - maegashira 2
Ōrora Satoshi - Anatoliy Valeryevich Mihahanov - Buryatia - 2000–2018 - makushita 43
Roga Tokiyoshi - Amartuvshin Amarsanaa - Tuva (Mongolian-Russian) - 2018–active - juryo 9
Rohō Yukio - Soslan Feliksovich Baradzov - North Ossetia-Alania - 2002–2008 - komusubi
Wakanohō Toshinori - Soslan Aleksandrovich Gagloev - North Ossetia-Alania - 2005–2008 - maegashira 1

NOTE: prior to the end of WWII, the southern half of Sakhalin was controlled by Japan as Karafuto.  For a Karafuto-born wrestler, see Japanese-born rikishi of non-Japanese or mixed ethnicity.

Samoa

Nankairyū Tarō - Saba Kiriful - 1984–1988 - maegashira 2
Nanyōzakura - Faaleva Fofoga - 1984–1988 - makushita 48

NOTE: Rikishi from American Samoa and Hawaiians of Samoan descent are listed under the United States heading.

Sri Lanka

Tochitaikai Jiro - Sri Aminda de Perera - 1992–1992 - jonokuchi 34

Taiwan
Eigayama Hiromasa - Zhi-min Zeng - 1986–1993 - makushita 32
Kaho Fumio - Pengwen Chen - 1989–1990 - jonidan 55
Maedaiko Ichiro - Haolun Xu - 1988–1995 - sandanme 16
Maenoumi Takeo - Jiancheng Liao - 1989–1991 - sandanme 36
Ohayama Yoshio - Kunfang Xie - 1990–1995 - makushita 53
Rakoten Keigo - Qigang Zhen - 1990–1991 - jonidan 106
Shu - Jianyan Zhou - 1988–1991 - jonidan 5
Tamayama - Akira Yokone - 1966–1972 - sandanme 75
Tatsunohana Ritsuei - Lirong Chen - 1989–1994 - makushita 45
Tominohana - Jiawei Ding - 1988–1992 - jonidan 31
Tochinohana Choo - Chao-huei Liu - 1980–1988 - juryo 4

Tonga

Aotsurugi Kenta - Tebita Rato Taufa (Tebita Togawa) - 2001–2009 - sandanme 1
Hinodeshima - Shioeri (?) - 1974–1976 - sandanme 34
Fukunoshima Hiroshi - Tonga Uli'uli Fifita - 1974–1977 - makushita 27
Minaminoshima Isamu - Minaminoshima Isamu Falevai - 2001–2008 - makushita 21
Minaminoshima Takeshi - Tebita Vaiola Falevai - 1974–1976 - makushita 37 
Sachinoshima - Sione Havea Vailahi - 1975–1976 - sandanme 36 
Tomonoshima Naoyuki - Viri Manulea Fifita - 1975–1976 - jonidan 18
Yashinoshima Noboru - Moleni Fe'aomoeata Tauki'uvea - 1974–1976 - makushita 53

Ukraine
 Shishi Masaru - Serhii Sokolovskyi (Сергій Соколовський) - 2020–active - makushita 7

United Kingdom

Hidenokuni Hajime - Nathan John Strange - England (Kent) - 1989–1990 - jonidan 89

United States

Akebono Taro § - Chadwick George Haheo Rowan - Hawaiian (Hawaii) - 1988–2001 - 64th yokozuna
Araiwa Kamenosuke - Cal Lee Martin - California - 1968–1971 - makushita 33
Daiki Susumu - Percy Pomaikai Kipapa - Hawaiian (Hawaii) - 1991–1998 - juryo 10
Gosetsu - Laurent Raymond - Hawaii - 1982–1983 - sandanme 86
Hiraga Shoji - Shoji Hiraga - Japanese-American (California) - 1934–1938 - jonidan 23
Junyo - Isaac Fuailutago Loe - Hawaii - 1983–1983 - jonidan 132
Kamikiiwa Ryuta - Wayne Mahelani Vierra Jr. - Hawaiian (Hawaii) - 1990–1991  - sandanme 22
Konishiki Yasokichi - Saleva'a Fuauli Atisano'e - Samoan (Hawaii) - 1984–1997 - ozeki
Koryu Katsuichi - Eric Cosier Gaspar - Hawaii - 1990–1997 - makushita 49
Matsuryuyama Masao - Robert Masao Suetsugu - Japanese-American (Washington) - 1975–1985 - makushita 24
Muryu - John Robert Collins - Hawaii - 1976–1981 - makushita 55
Musashibo Benkei - William Molina - 1987–1988 - jonidan 59 
Musashikuni Mamu - Fiamalu Penitani - Samoan (Hawaii) - 2013–2019 - makushita 26 
Musashimaru Kōyō § - Fiamalu Penitani - Samoan-Tongan (American Samoa) - 1989–2004 - 67th yokozuna
Nanfu Kenzo - Kaleo Kekauoha (Kaleo Suzuki) - Hawaiian (Hawaii) - 1990–1996 - makushita 1
Narushio - Emanuel Kaefaia Jr - Hawaii - 1983–1984 - jonidan 23
Ozora Hiroshi - Troy Levi Talaimatai - Samoan (Hawaii) - 1989–1995 - makushita 13 
Sentoryū Henri - Henry Armstrong Miller - Japanese-American (Missouri) - 1988–2003 - maegashira 12
Shinnishiki - Vincent Divoux - California - 1988–1990 - sandanme 10
Sunahama Shoji - William Tayler Hopkins - Hawaii - 1990–1997 - juryo 5
Takai Tsutomu - Ola Rowan - Hawaii - 1989 - jonokuchi 39
Takamio Daisei - Sione (John) Tekeriri Feleunga - Hawaii - 1986–1997  - makushita 2
Takamishu - Teila Tuli (Taylor Wily) - Samoan (Hawaii) - 1987–1989 - makushita 2 
Takamiyama Daigoro § - Jesse James Wailani Kuhaulua - Hawaiian (Hawaii) - 1964–1984 - sekiwake
Takanoumi - Phillip Smoak - Texas - 1981 - jonokuchi 29
Toyonishiki Kiichiro - Harley Kiichiro Ozaki - Japanese-American (Colorado) - 1936–1944 - maegashira 20
Wakachikara Toru - Glenn Kalima - Hawaii - 1991–1994 - makushita 26
Wakaichirō Ken - Ichiro Young - Japanese-American (Texas) - 2016–2020 – sandanme 32
Wakatakami Taro - George Pulaian - Hawaii - 1977–1983 - makushita 40
Wakayashima Masaki - Asato Reid - Japanese-American (Hawaii) - 1976–1978 - sandanme 32
Yamato Gō - George Kalima - Hawaii - 1990–1997 - maegashira 12

(§) marks a retired foreign-born wrestler who became a sumo elder.

See also
List of active sumo wrestlers
List of past sumo wrestlers

References

Lists of sumo wrestlers